This is a list of Student radio stations operated by the students of a college, university or other educational institution. In the United States these radio stations are called College radio stations, sometimes Campus radio and in the United Kingdom they are called student radio stations. This list is organized by country. For each station, a link to the associated college or university appears.

Australia
 Adelaide – Radio Adelaide, University of Adelaide
 Armidale – TUNE! FM, University of New England
 Bathurst – 2MCE, Charles Sturt University
 Canberra – 87.8 UCFM, University of Canberra
 Darwin – 104.1 Territory FM, Charles Darwin University
 Melbourne – SYN FM, RMIT University
 Newcastle – 2NUR, University of Newcastle
 Perth – Curtin FM, Curtin University
 Sydney – 2SER, Macquarie University and University of Technology, Sydney
 Sydney – SURG, Sydney University Radio Group 
 Wodonga – Wodonga TAFE Radio, Wodonga Institute Of TAFE

Bangladesh

Canada 
 See List of campus radio stations in Canada.

Croatia
 Radio Student – Faculty of Political Sciences, University of Zagreb

Denmark
 XFM – Technical University of Denmark

Germany
 Paderborn - L'UniCo 89,4 , Universität Paderborn

India 

 NITW Campus Radio

Ireland 
 Cork Campus Radio
 Flirt FM
 Wired FM
 Belfield FM
 Queen's Radio

Lithuania 
 Kaunas – KTU radio Gaudeamus, Kaunas University of Technology

New Zealand
 Auckland – BFM, University of Auckland
 Christchurch – RDU, University of Canterbury
 Dunedin – Radio One, University of Otago
 Palmerston North – Radio Control, Massey University

Philippines
 DZLB, University of the Philippines Los Baños
 DZUP, University of the Philippines Diliman
 UST Tiger Radio, University of Santo Tomas

Portugal
 Coimbra – Rádio Universidade de Coimbra

South Africa
 Cape Town – UCT Radio, University of Cape Town
 Grahamstown – Rhodes Music Radio, Rhodes University
 Johannesburg – UJFM Campus Radio, University of Johannesburg
 Johannesburg - Vow FM, University of the Witwatersrand
 Pretoria – Tuks FM, University of Pretoria
 Stellenbosch – MFM 92.6, Stellenbosch University

Sweden 
 Radio AF – Lund University

Switzerland
 Lausanne – Fréquence Banane, EPFL

Turkey
 Istanbul – Radio ITU, Istanbul Technical University

United Arab Emirates
 Dubai – Campus Radio ME, Dubai

United Kingdom
 Bangor – Storm FM, University of Wales, Bangor
 Bath – University Radio Bath, University of Bath
 Bedfordshire – Radio LaB, University of Bedfordshire
 Birmingham
Burn FM, University of Birmingham
Scratch Radio, Birmingham City University
 Bradford – RamAir, Bradford University
 Bristol – BURST, University of Bristol
Hub Radio, University of the West of England
 Bournemouth – Nerve Radio, Bournemouth University
 Cambridge – Cam FM 97.2, University of Cambridge
 Canterbury – CSR, University of Kent/Canterbury Christ Church University
 Cape Cornwall – Cape Radio, Cape Cornwall School
 Cardiff – Xpress Radio, Cardiff University 
 Coventry – Radio Warwick, University of Warwick
 Coventry – Source Radio, Coventry University
 Derby – d:one, University of Derby
 Durham – Purple Radio, Durham University
 Edinburgh – Fresh Air (Edinburgh), University of Edinburgh
 Egham; London – Insanity Radio, Royal Holloway, University of London
 Exeter – Xpression FM, University of Exeter
 Glasgow – Radio Caley (Glasgow Caledonian University)
 Gloucestershire – Tone Radio, University of Gloucestershire
 Guildford – GU2 Radio, University of Surrey
 Hertfordshire – Crush Radio, University of Hertfordshire
 Keele – Kube Radio, Keele University
 Hull – Jam 1575, University of Hull
 Lancaster – Bailrigg FM, Lancaster University
 Leeds – LSRfm, University of Leeds
 Leicester – Demon FM, De Montfort University
 Liverpool
Looprevil Radio, Liverpool John Moores University
LSRadio, University of Liverpool
 London
Blast Radio, University of West London
IC Radio, Imperial College London
PuLSE Radio, London School of Economics
Rare FM, University College London
Smoke Radio, University of Westminster
 Loughborough – LCR, Loughborough University
 Manchester – Fuse FM, University of Manchester
 Nottingham – University Radio Nottingham, University of Nottingham
 Norwich – Livewire, University of East Anglia
 Portsmouth – Pure FM, University of Portsmouth
 Sheffield – Forge Radio, University of Sheffield
 Stoke On Trent – Heatwave Radio, Stoke On Trent College
Kube Radio, Keele University
 Southampton
Surge, University of Southampton
Radio Sonar, Southampton Solent University
 St Andrews – STAR: St Andrews Radio, University of St Andrews
 Stirling – Air3 – University of Stirling
 University of Hertfordshire – Crush Radio
 Winchester – 7Radio, Peter Symonds College
 York – University Radio York, University of York

United States

References 

Campus radio stations
College radio stations